Lalmatia refers to a neighbourhood in Dhaka, Bangladesh.

It also refers to:
Lalmatia, Godda, a village in Jhrkhand, India
Lalmatia Colliery, in Godda district, Jharkhand, India